The Lansdowne Folk Club is a 501(c)(3) all volunteer non-profit corporation dedicated to presenting, promoting and preserving folk, acoustic and blues music in the Greater Philadelphia Metropolitan area. It was founded in 1992.

History
The Lansdowne Folk Club, Lansdowne, Pennsylvania, was founded in October 1992 by Lee and Flossie Jones, Mike Joyce and John and Kate Hetherington. During this period the founders began working on a name for the club, purpose, a "vibe," building a portable stage, designing a logo and having a stage back drop made that we still use today.  After looking at several possibilities for a venue to hold the concerts, the Twentieth Century Club was chosen for its elegant look and great acoustics.  The founders planned a four show concert series beginning in March and ending in June.

The first concert was held on Thursday, March 23, 1993 featuring Robin Greenstein with Jim Strait opening.  Since then the Lansdowne Folk Club has become a staple of the folk music community in the Greater Philadelphia Metropolitan area.  Staffed entirely by volunteers, the club has hosted over 200 performances since its inception. Performers Dave Van Ronk, Walter Hyatt, John Renbourn, Jenny Availa, Bill Staines, Roy Book Binder, The Kennedys, Ben Arnold, 5-3 Woodland, and Fitzgerald and Beach have all graced the stage of the Lansdowne Folk Club.

Footnotes

External links 

 Lansdowne Folk Club Website
 Lansdowne Folk Club on Facebook
  Lansdowne Folk Club on Myspace
  Lansdowne Folk Club at the Philadelphia Folksong Society
 Smithsonian Center for Folklife and Cultural Heritage''
 The Crooked Road: Heritage music trail - famous 243-mile trail where folk and bluegrass music originated.

Music organizations based in the United States
Folk music organizations
Non-profit organizations based in Pennsylvania
Lansdowne, Pennsylvania
501(c)(3) organizations